Kevin Schmidt (born February 14, 1986) is a Canadian-German professional ice hockey defenceman. He is under contract with EC VSV of the Austrian Hockey League (EBEL).

Early life 
A native of Markham, Ontario, Schmidt graduated from St. Michael’s College School in 2005. He enrolled at Bowling Green State University and played in 147 games for the Falcons during his four-year college career, serving as alternate captain his senior season.

Career 
Schmidt spent his first season of professional hockey in the East Coast Hockey League, recording 30 points (seven goals, 23 assists) in 50 contests for the Wheeling Nailers in 2009-10.

Schmidt moved to the Hannover Indians of the second German division for the 2010–2011 season and was selected by the Hamburg Freezers, a member of Germany’s topflight Deutsche Eishockey Liga (DEL), prior to the 2011–2012 campaign. In Hamburg, Schmidt evolved into a solid DEL player and was given contract extension until 2017, in December 2013. However, the Freezers folded in May 2016 and Schmidt had to look for other opportunities after five years with the team.

On June 29, 2016, he signed with Dornbirner EC of the Austrian Hockey League. He opted to return to Germany for the 2017–18 season, joining the Iserlohn Roosters.

Personal life 
Schmidt was granted German citizenship in August 2010. His father Horst was born in Stuttgart, Germany, and moved to Canada with his parents as a child.

References

External links
 

1986 births
Living people
Bowling Green Falcons men's ice hockey players
Canadian ice hockey defencemen
Dornbirn Bulldogs players
Hamburg Freezers players
Hannover Indians players
Iserlohn Roosters players
Ice hockey people from Ontario
St. Michael's Buzzers players
EC VSV players
Wheeling Nailers players
Canadian expatriate ice hockey players in Austria
Canadian expatriate ice hockey players in Germany